Sprott is an unincorporated community in Perry County, Alabama, United States. It is located at the intersection of Alabama Highways 14, and 183, northeast of Marion.

Notable person
 J. Hugh Nichols, County Executive of Howard County, Maryland from 1978 to 1986

References

Sprott was the nearby community of the Ricketts, Woods, and Gudger families, made famous (infamous?) in the book Let Us Now Praise Famous Men by James Agee with photographs by Walker Evans, one of which photos shows Sprott circa 1938–39.

Unincorporated communities in Perry County, Alabama
Unincorporated communities in Alabama